Women of Zimbabwe Arise or WOZA is a civic movement in Zimbabwe that was formed in 2003 by Jenni Williams to provide women, from all walks of life, with a united voice to speak out on issues affecting their day-to-day lives, empower female leadership that will lead community involvement in pressing for solutions to the current crisis, encourage women to stand up for their rights and freedoms and lobby and advocate on those issues affecting women and their families.

WOZA is supported by Amnesty International.

Etymology
WOZA, the acronym of Women of Zimbabwe Arise, is a Ndebele word meaning "Come forward".

Awards
In 2008, WOZA was awarded the Amnesty International Menschenrechtspreis (human rights award) of 2008 by the German chapter of Amnesty International. The organisation was founded by Sheila Dube, Magodonga Mahlangu,  and Jenni Williams.

On 23 November 2009, Magodonga Mahlangu and Jenni Williams received the Robert F. Kennedy Human Rights Award. The award was presented by US president Barack Obama with the words: "By her example, Magodonga has shown the women of WOZA and the people of Zimbabwe that they can undermine their oppressors' power with their own power – that they can sap a dictator's strength with their own.  Her courage has inspired others to summon theirs." In her remarks accepting the award, Magodonga Mahlangu quoted Robert F. Kennedy, saying: "The future is not a gift: it is an achievement. Every generation helps make its own future." In 2012, WOZA's Jenni Williams was the recipient of the Ginetta Sagan Award from Amnesty International USA as one of this organisations founders.

Continued police crackdown
Jenni Williams, Magodonga Mahlangu and other members of WOZA were arrested multiple times in the years from 2008 to 2011. On 12 February 2011, over a thousand men and women joined a WOZA Valentine's Day protest. In the weeks that followed, several WOZA members were arrested and reportedly tortured in Bulawayo. WOZA states that police officers have contacted WOZA's lawyer to demand that Williams and Mahlangu report to the police station for unstated reasons. The two women were imprisoned and released on bail later than the other prisoners taken after the same protest. Amnesty International expressed concern for the safety of group members and named WOZA a 2011 "priority case".

MOZA
In August 2006, at the WOZA National Assembly, it was resolved to form Men of Zimbabwe Arise (MOZA). Men, mostly youthful, have been ‘coming forward’ to join this non-violent struggle for a better Zimbabwe.

References

External links
 Official Website
 Interview with Jenni Williams, November 2008
 "The Power of Love Conquers the Love of Power: Women of Zimbabwe Challenge Mugabe's Regime", May 2007 issue of Peacework Magazine, archived
 "Zimbabwean Dissidents Unite in Prayer for Peace", May 2007 issue of Peacework Magazine, archived
 "Fighting Repression with Love: The Traumatic Effects on Women who Speak Out", May 2008 issue of Peacework Magazine, archived
 Zimbabwe: 100 WOZA And MOZA Arrested in Bulawayo, from AllAfrica.com, via Southwest Radio Africa, February 14, 2009

Nonviolent resistance movements
Political organisations based in Zimbabwe
Politics of Zimbabwe
Robert F. Kennedy Human Rights Award laureates
Women human rights activists